Recurrent branch may refer to:
 Recurrent branch of the median nerve
 Recurrent branch of the radial
 Recurrent nerves of Luschka